Rick Dyer may refer to:

 Rick Dyer (video game designer), American video game designer and writer
 Rick Dyer (hoaxer), American Bigfoot enthusiast

See also
 Richard Dyer (d. 1605), English soldier and courtier
 Richard Dyer (born 1945), English academic
 Richard Dyer (footballer) (born 1968), Montserratian footballer
 Richard Dyer-Bennet (1913–1991), English-born American folk singer